Shaul Mofaz (4 November 1948) is a retired Israeli military officer and politician. He joined the Israel Defense Forces in 1966 and served in the Paratroopers Brigade. He fought in the Six-Day War, Yom Kippur War, 1982 Lebanon War, and Operation Entebbe with the paratroopers and Sayeret Matkal, an elite special forces unit. In 1998 he became the IDF's sixteenth Chief of staff serving until 2002. He is of Iranian Jewish ancestry.

After leaving the army, he entered politics. He was appointed Minister of Defense in 2002, holding the position until 2006 when he was elected to the Knesset on the Kadima list. He then served as Deputy Prime Minister and Minister of Transportation and Road Safety until 2009. After becoming Kadima leader in March 2012 he became Leader of the Opposition, before returning to the cabinet during a 70-day spell in which he served as Acting Prime Minister, Vice Prime Minister and Minister without Portfolio. Kadima was reduced to just two seats in the 2013 elections, and Mofaz retired from politics shortly before the 2015 elections.

Biography

Early life

Shaul Mofaz was born Shahrām Mofazzazkār on 4 November 1948 in Tehran, Iran, to Persian Jewish parents from Isfahan, and lived in Tehran until his family moved to Israel. His father was principal of the ORT school in Tehran. Mofaz immigrated to Israel with his family in 1957 when he was nine years old. The family settled in Eilat, where Mofaz grew up. His father's attempt to open a small factory in Eilat failed, and he had to support the family by working as a menial laborer. His family lived in a one-and-a-half room apartment and his parents struggled to put food on the table. At age 10 he had to work in construction to help support his family. Mofaz attended a religious elementary school in Eilat, and at age 14, his father sent him to an agricultural boarding school in Nahalal in the Jezreel Valley, where studies were combined with agricultural work. Mofaz recalled the boarding school as his first real exposure to wider Israeli society, and struggling to fit in and be seen as a "real Israeli", recalling that "you're in class with children from Nahalal who are Israelis with real roots in the country, children of the valley nobility. These princes who live in the big houses on the big farms of Nahalal, and where do you come from? From nowhere, from Tehran, from Eilat, from a tiny apartment in a housing project." He became determined to become a paratrooper in the army, seeing it as a way for him to become fully Israeli.

Military service 
Upon graduating from high school in 1966, he was conscripted into Israel Defense Forces and served in the Paratroopers Brigade. He fought in the Six-Day War as a paratrooper on the southern front against the Egyptian Army. After his mandatory service, Mofaz remained in the IDF as a career officer. He became an officer in 1969, and took command of a paratrooper platoon in the 890th Battalion of the Paratroopers Brigade, then commanded a company of the 890th Battalion in 1971. He took part in the War of Attrition and the Yom Kippur War. During the Yom Kippur War, he took part in Operation Gown and Operation Davidka, two raids deep in Syrian territory. Mofaz became Deputy Commander of the 890th Battalion in 1974. He was appointed Deputy Commander of Sayeret Matkal, an elite commando unit, in 1975, and took part in Operation Entebbe the following year. After taking a sabbatical to study at Bar-Ilan University in 1976, he returned to active service in 1978 and was appointed commander of the 202nd Battalion of the Paratroopers Brigade, and became Deputy Commander of the Paratroopers Brigade in 1980. He commanded the 769th Territorial Brigade in 1981.

Mofaz served as an infantry brigade commander during the 1982 Lebanon War. Afterwards he attended the US Marine Corps Command and Staff College in Quantico, Virginia, United States. On his return he was briefly appointed commander of the IDF Command and Staff College before returning to active service. He was appointed Commander of the Paratroopers Brigade in 1986, and led its forces in counterinsurgency operations in the South Lebanon security zone. He played a major role in Operation Law and Order.

Mofaz served in a series of senior military posts, and was promoted to the rank of Brigadier General in 1988. In 1993 he was made commander of the IDF forces in the West Bank. In 1994, he was promoted to Major General, commanding the Southern Command, during which the IDF battled Hamas and Islamic Jihad networks in the Gaza Strip. In 1996, he served as head of the Planning Directorate of the IDF General Staff. His rapid rise continued; in 1997 Mofaz was appointed Deputy Chief of the General Staff and Commander of the Operations Directorate. In 1998, he was appointed Chief of the General Staff.

His term of Chief of Staff was noted for financial and structural reforms of the IDF. His tenure also saw continued operations in the South Lebanon security zone and the withdrawal from the security zone in 2000. But the most significant event in his tenure was the eruption of the Second Intifada in September 2000. The tough tactics undertaken by Mofaz drew widespread concern from the international community but were broadly supported by the Israeli public. Controversy erupted over Israeli actions during the Battle of Jenin, intermittent raids in the Gaza Strip, and the continued isolation of Yasser Arafat.

Mofaz had foreseen the wave of violence coming as early as 1999 and prepared the IDF for intense guerrilla warfare in the territories. He fortified posts in the Gaza Strip and kept Israeli military casualties low. While he was known for claiming, "Israel has the most moral army in the world," he drew criticism from both Israeli and international human rights monitoring groups because of the methods he had undertaken, including using armored bulldozers to demolish 2,500 Palestinian civilian homes, displacing thousands, in order to create a security "buffer zone" along the Rafah border.

Political career
Following a government crisis in 2002, Shaul Mofaz was appointed Defense Minister by Ariel Sharon. Although he supported an agreement with the Palestinians, he was willing to make no compromise in the war against militant groups such as Hamas, Islamic Jihad, Tanzim, and Al-Aqsa Martyrs Brigades.

The fact that he had only recently left his position as IDF Chief of Staff prevented him from participating in the 2003 election (by which time Mofaz had joined Sharon's Likud). Nevertheless, Sharon reappointed him as Defense Minister in the new government.

On 21 November 2005, Mofaz rejected Sharon's invitation to join his new party, Kadima, and instead announced his candidacy for the leadership of Likud. But, on 11 December 2005, one day after he promised he would never leave the Likud, he withdrew from both the leadership race and the Likud to join Kadima.

Following the elections in late March 2006, Mofaz was moved from the position of Defense Minister and received the Transport ministry in the new Cabinet installed on 4 May 2006.

In 2008, with Israel's then prime minister, Ehud Olmert, being pressured to resign due to corruption charges, Mofaz announced that he would run for the leadership of the Kadima party.

On 5 August 2008, Mofaz officially entered the race to be leader of Kadima. That same day he received a blessing by Shas spiritual leader Rabbi Ovadia Yosef. On 17 September 2008, he lost the Kadima party election, losing to Tzipi Livni for the spot of the Prime Minister and leader of Kadima. Livni's narrow margin of 431 votes was 43.1% to Shaul Mofaz's 42.0%, a huge difference from the 10 to 12-point exit polls margins. She said the "national responsibility (bestowed) by the public brings me to approach this job with great reverence". Mofaz accepted the Kadima primary's result, despite his lawyer, Yehuda Weinstein's appeal advice, and telephoned Livni congratulating her. Livni got 16,936 votes, with 16,505 votes, for Mofaz. Public Security Minister Avi Dichter and Interior Minister Meir Sheetrit had 6.5% and 8.5% respectively.

Placed second on the Kadima list, Mofaz retained his seat in the 2009 elections, but lost his cabinet position after Likud formed the government.

On 27 March 2012, Shaul Mofaz won the Kadima party leadership primaries by a landslide, defeating party chairwoman Tzipi Livni. Mofaz became Vice Prime Minister as part of a deal reached for a government of national unity with Binyamin Netanyahu. Mofaz said during the Kadima primaries that he would not join a government led by Netanyahu.

Mofaz left over Netanyahu's indecision over a draft reform law and warned that the prime minister was trying to patch together a majority for a vote to plunge the region into war.

In 2013 Kadima, just 4 years prior the ruling party, received 2% of the votes, barely passing to the Knesset.

In the buildup to the 2015 elections Kadima was not expect to pass the threshold, as it was raised to 3.25%. Mofaz negotiated with the Zionist Union alliance to bring Kadima onto their slate, but ended negotiations when it became clear he would not be their candidate for Defense Minister. Immediately after Mofaz announced he was not joining the Zionist Union slate, it was announced the former Military Intelligence Directorate (Israel) head Amos Yadlin was appointed to the Zionist Union slate and would be their candidate for Defense Minister. Within a week of his announcement that he was not running with the Zionist Union, Mofaz announced his retirement from politics.

Personal life
Mofaz is married to Orit with four children. His son Yonatan, who was named for Yonatan Netanyahu, also became an IDF officer and attained the rank of Colonel. He lives in Kochav Yair.

In popular culture
A fictionalized version of Mofaz appeared in the 2008 drama film Lemon Tree.

Awards and decorations

See also
Moshe Katsav
List of Israel's Chiefs of the General Staff
Iran–Israel relations
Lemon Tree

References

External links

1948 births
Living people
20th-century Israeli military personnel
21st-century Israeli military personnel
Iranian emigrants to Israel
Iranian Jews
Israeli Jews
Israeli people of Iranian-Jewish descent
Israeli politicians of Iranian descent
Jewish Israeli politicians
Kadima leaders
Leaders of the Opposition (Israel)
Members of the 17th Knesset (2006–2009)
Members of the 18th Knesset (2009–2013)
Members of the 19th Knesset (2013–2015)
Ministers of Defense of Israel
Ministers of Transport of Israel
Operation Entebbe
People from Eilat
People from Tehran